Jennie Rintala (née Sunnarborg; born 10 July 1990) is an American-Australian professional basketball player.

College
Rintala played college basketball at South Dakota State University in Brookings, South Dakota, playing with the Jackrabbits in the Summit League of NCAA Division I.

Statistics 

|-
|2008–09 
| align="left" |South Dakota State
|24
|0
|8.7
|.429
|.000
|.706
|1.9
|0.1
|0.2
|0.5
|0.8
|3.3
|-
|2009–10
| align="left" |South Dakota State
|33
|13
|16.5
|.455
|.385
|.759
|4.1
|0.5
|0.3
|1.2
|2.0
|7.6
|-
|2010–11 
| align="left"|South Dakota State
|33
|33
|24.0
|.509
|.222
|.684
|4.3
|1.4
|0.9
|1.3
|2.8
|13.0
|-
|2011–12
| align="left"|South Dakota State
|33
|33
|25.5
|.439
|.389
|.806
|6.2
|1.5
|0.9
|0.4
|2.0
|14.4
|-
|Career
|
|123
|79
|19.4
|.467
|.331
|.753
|4.3
|1.0
|0.6
|0.9
|2.0
|10.0

Career

Australia
In 2013, Rintala was signed by the Kalamunda Eastern Suns to play in Western Australia's State Basketball League. She had a very successful debut in the SBL, leading the Suns to their first grand final and taking home the club MVP award for the 2013 season. Rintala would remain with the Suns for the 2014 season.

In 2017, Rintala joined the WNBL's Perth Lynx in their development training squad for the 2017–18. Rintala trained throughout the season, but did not take the court due to her pending permanent residency status.

In October 2019, Rintala was signed by the Adelaide Lightning for a stint in the 2019–20 season. Rintala joined the Lightning's squad after their lead import, Crystal Langhorne, sustained a season ending knee injury.

In September 2020, Rintala signed with the Bendigo Spirit for the 2020 season. Rintala was signed as an Australian national after naturalizing and recently obtaining her citizenship.

Europe
In 2015, Rintala travelled to Europe and made her professional debut, signing with Rhein-Main Baskets in Germany's DBBL. Rintala's time in the league was short-lived, playing only seven games before suffering a knee injury that subsequently ended her season.

In 2018, Rintala joined Résidence Walferdange in Luxembourg, competing in the Nationale 1 league.

References

1990 births
Living people
Forwards (basketball)
American women's basketball players
American expatriate sportspeople in Australia
American emigrants to Australia
Australian women's basketball players
Naturalised citizens of Australia
South Dakota State University alumni
Adelaide Lightning players
Bendigo Spirit players
Basketball players from Minnesota
People from Osseo, Minnesota